Gomphus graslinii is a species of dragonfly in the family Gomphidae. It is found in France, Portugal, and Spain. Its natural habitat is rivers. It is threatened by habitat loss.

Sources 

Gomphidae
Dragonflies of Europe
Insects described in 1842
Taxonomy articles created by Polbot